The 1997 South American Rugby Championship was the 20th edition of the competition of the leading national Rugby Union teams in South America.

The tournament wasn't played in a host country, but in different venues in each country participating.

Argentina won the tournament.

Standings 

{| class="wikitable"
|-
!width=165|Team
!width=40|Played
!width=40|Won
!width=40|Drawn
!width=40|Lost
!width=40|For
!width=40|Against
!width=40|Difference
!width=40|Pts
|- bgcolor=#ccffcc align=center
|align=left| 
|3||3||0||0||184||27||+ 157||6
|- align=center
|align=left| 
|3||2||0||1||116||82||+ 34||4
|- align=center
|align=left| 
|3||1||0||2||85||98||- 13||2
|- align=center
|align=left| 
|3||0||0||3||25||203||- 178||0
|}

Results

References

1997
1997 rugby union tournaments for national teams
1997 in Argentine rugby union
rugby union
rugby union
rugby union
1997 in South American rugby union